Paul McCarron (April 5, 1934 – August 11, 2013) was an American businessman and politician.

Born in Minneapolis, Minnesota, McCarron served in the United States Navy and then went to the University of St. Thomas. McCarron was president and general manager of McGregor Agri-Corp Inc.

In 1979, McCarron was elected to the Spring Lake Park, Minnesota City Council. From 1973 to 1983, he served in the Minnesota House of Representatives and was a Democrat. In 1982, he was elected an Anoka County, Minnesota commissioner.

McCarron died in Spring Lake Park City, Minnesota of heart failure.

Notes

1934 births
2013 deaths
People from Spring Lake Park, Minnesota
Politicians from Minneapolis
Military personnel from Minnesota
University of St. Thomas (Minnesota) alumni
Businesspeople from Minnesota
Minnesota city council members
County commissioners in Minnesota
Democratic Party members of the Minnesota House of Representatives
Businesspeople from Minneapolis
20th-century American businesspeople